Semi-parliamentary system can refer to either a prime-ministerial system, in which voters simultaneously vote for both members of legislature and the prime minister, or to a system of government in which the legislature is split into two parts that are both directly elected – one that has the power to remove the members of the executive by a vote of no confidence and another that does not. The former was first proposed by Maurice Duverger, who used it to refer to Israel from 1996-2001. The second was identified by German academic Steffen Ganghof.

In a prime-ministerial system, as in standard parliamentary systems, the prime minister can still be dismissed by a vote of no confidence, this however effectively causes a snap election for both the prime minister and the legislature (a rule commonly expressed by the brocard aut simul stabunt aut simul cadent, Latin for "they will either stand together, or fall together"). 

Like semi-presidential systems, semi-parliamentary systems are a strongly rationalized form of parliamentary systems. After Israel decided to abolish the direct election of prime ministers in 2001, there are no national prime-ministerial systems in the world; however, a prime-ministerial system is used in Israeli and Italian cities and towns to elect mayors and councils. There are two national and five subnational examples of the other type of semi-parliamentarism still in existence today—the national examples of Australia and Japan and the subnational examples of the five bicameral Australian states.

Functioning 
Parliamentary systems originated in constitutional monarchies, in which the government was dually accountable to the parliament and the king: the plurality of opinions of elected assemblies was then balanced by the direction of the monarch. Over time, the power of hereditary monarchs came to be understood as untenable in a democracy, leading many constitutional monarchies to evolve into parliamentary republics, while in the remaining ones the monarch became an increasingly ceremonial figure: regardless of the presence of an elected or unelected head of state, the parliament was thus established as the dominating institution.

In their most basic form, parliamentary systems tend to be quite anarchic, as in the well-known cases of the French third and fourth republics. The attitude of parliaments towards governments is essentially oppositive, as elected assemblies are often incapable of taking energetic decisions whose advantages will only be perceived in the future, but whose disadvantages are immediately experienced by the electors. This calls for a strong rationalization of parliamentary systems, such as the one that developed in the United Kingdom, where the hereditary monarch has effectively been replaced by an "elected monarch", namely the prime minister.

Being largely based on conventions, the Westminster system cannot be easily replicated in other countries. In his 1956 proposal, Maurice Duverger suggested that France could attain government stability by means of a direct election of the Prime Minister, that was to take place at the same time as the legislative election, by means of a separate ballot paper. The Prime Minister and his supporting parliamentary majority would need to be inseparable for the whole duration of the legislature: in case of a vote of no-confidence, forced resignation, or dissolution of the parliament, a snap election would be held for both the National Assembly and the Prime Minister.

Direct election of the prime minister, alone, would not be sufficient to ensure government stability: a second round of election should be employed so that electors can be allowed to express their ideological preferences in the first round, and designate a majority in the second. The electoral law would then provide the Prime Minister with a parliamentary majority.

Under Charles de Gaulle, France adopted a different rationalization of parliamentary government called semi-presidential system. Duverger's proposal thus remained unnamed until the French political scientist termed it "semi-parliamentary" in 1996.

Main characteristics of prime-ministerial systems 
The legislature and the head of government are simultaneously elected by the people
A separate head of state with ceremonial functions may exist (as in most parliamentary systems)
The legislature has the power to dismiss the head of government with a vote of no confidence (as in a parliamentary system)
The term of the legislature and that of the head of government coincide: if the head of government resigns or is dismissed by the legislature, the legislature is automatically dissolved
The electoral law may ensure that the parties supporting the directly elected head of government obtain a majority of seats in the legislature

Steffen Gangof's semi-parliamentarism 

In the second form of the semi-parliamentary system, identified by German academic Steffen Ganghof, the issues of a lack of separation of powers as present in a traditional parliamentary system and that of executive personalisation as found in a presidential system are confronted by dividing the legislature into 2 elected assemblies. One of these assemblies may be referred to as a "confidence chamber" that has the power to dismiss a prime minister and their ministers, while the other may be called a "legislative chamber". This chamber acts in a manner similar to that of the independent legislative branches that operate in presidential systems, able to introduce, amend and reject legislation, but unable to vote "no confidence" in the government.

In the book "Beyond Presidentialism and Parliamentarism. Democratic Design and the Separation of Powers", Ganghof gives this abstract definition of semi-parliamentarism:

This form of Semi-Parliamentary government has also been further explored by Tarunabh Khaitan, who coined the phrase "Moderated Parliamentarism" to describe a form of Semi-parliamentarism with several distinctive features: mixed bicameralism, moderated (but distinct) electoral systems for each chamber, weighted multipartisanship, asynchronous electoral schedules, and deadlock resolution through conference committees.

Examples

Italian local administrations 

In 1993, Italy adopted a new electoral law introducing the direct election of mayors, in conjunction with municipal councils. On a single ballot paper, the elector can express two votes, one for the mayor, and the other one for the council. The mayor is elected with a two-round system: at the first round, the candidate receiving the absolute majority of valid votes is elected; if no candidate receives an absolute majority, a second round between the two top-ranking candidates is held. Councils are elected by semi-proportional representation: the party or coalition linked to the mayor elect receives at least 60% of the seats, while the other parties are allocated seats in a proportional fashion. This ensures the existence of a working majority for the mayor: the council can remove the mayor with an absolute majority vote, but in this case it also causes its own dissolution and a snap election.

In 1999, a constitutional reform introduced the direct election of regional presidents, whose term is linked to that of regional councils much in the same way as it is the case for mayors and municipal councils.

Direct election of the Prime Minister of Israel (1996-2001)
During the thirteenth Knesset (1992–1996), Israel decided to hold a separate ballot for Prime Minister modeled after American presidential elections. This system was instituted in part because the Israeli electoral system makes it all but impossible for one party to win a majority. However, no majority bonus was assigned to the Prime Minister's supporting party: therefore, he was forced to obtain the support of other parties in the Knesset.

As this effectively added rigidity to the system without improving its stability, direct election of the Prime Minister was abolished after the 2001 election.

This system has been described by some as an anti-model of prime-ministerial systems. In Israel, the basic laws allowed, under certain conditions, special elections for the prime minister only, with no dissolution of the Knesset: in practice, there were as many as eight special elections in just a few years, which constitutes a considerable departure from the simul simul principle. For this reason, the Israeli version of the prime-ministerial system was never considered to work functionally.

'Washminster'  system of Australia 

Australia is, in many respects, a unique hybrid with influences from the United States Constitution as well as from the traditions and conventions of the Westminster system and some indigenous features. Australia is exceptional because the government faces a fully elected upper house, the Senate, which must be willing to pass all its legislation. Although only the lower house, the House of Representatives, can hold a no-confidence vote against the government, in practice the support of the Senate is also necessary in order to govern. The Senate maintains the ability similar to that held by the British House of Lords, prior to the enactment of the Parliament Act 1911, to block supply against the government of the day. A government that is unable to obtain supply can be dismissed by the governor-general: however, this is generally considered a last resort and is a highly controversial decision to take, given the conflict between the traditional concept of confidence as derived from the lower house and the ability of the Senate to block supply. Many political scientists have held that the Australian system of government was consciously devised as a blend or hybrid of the Westminster and the United States systems of government, especially since the Australian Senate is a powerful upper house like the U.S. Senate; this notion is expressed in the nickname "the Washminster mutation". The ability of upper houses to block supply also features in the parliaments of most Australian states.

Because of this arrangement, Australia and most of its states can be classified as "semi-parliamentary" according to Steffen Ganghof's criteria.

Related systems 
Many parliamentary democracies managed to increase the power of the head of government without resorting to direct election, usually by combining a selective electoral system with additional constitutional powers to the prime minister. For example, in Germany the presence of a sufficiently simple party system, combined with the constructive vote of no confidence and the possibility for the federal chancellor to demand a dissolution of the Bundestag in case of defeat in a confidence-linked vote, has brought many stable governments. In Spain, the presence of a selective electoral law which produced single-party parliamentary majorities for several decades, caused a de facto direct election of the prime minister (i.e. the leader of the majority party), who also has the constitutional power to dissolve the parliament. In contrast, the United Kingdom returned to become a more classical parliamentary system after the approval of the Fixed-term Parliaments Act 2011, with which the prime minister has lost the power to dissolve the House of Commons. The Fixed-term Parliaments Act 2011 was later repealed by the Dissolution and Calling of Parliament Act 2022.

The Italian electoral law approved in 2015 was based on a two-round system assigning to the winning party a majority bonus of 54% of the seats of the lower house. Together with a proposed constitutional reform which would have removed the upper house's power to dismiss governments, this also would have introduced a de facto direct election of the prime minister, bringing the form of government closer to a prime-ministerial system. The constitutional reform was however rejected by a referendum and the electoral law of 2015 was never used, as in 2017 it was replaced by a a new one, which doesn't assign a majority bonus to the party getting the most votes. 

After a referendum in 2015, the Constitution of Armenia has been reformed, transforming the country from a semi-presidential to a parliamentary system; the amended constitution requires that the electoral law for the National Assembly, which should be based on proportional representation, guarantee the existence of a working government majority, possibly by means of a two-round system. The 2017 general election will use proportional representation; if no party-coalition receives a majority of valid votes, a second round is held between the two political forces that got the highest results in the first round: the winner will receive 54% of the seats. Although this might yield a de facto direct election of the prime minister, the duration of the legislature and of the government are not entangled, as it would be required in a prime-ministerial republic.

See also 
List of countries by system of government
List of political systems in France
Parliamentary system
Presidential system
Semi-presidential system

References

Further reading
  
 

Parliamentary procedure
Political systems
Types of democracy